William Colridge Thompson Sr. (October 26, 1924 – December 24, 2018) was a New York State Senator and justice of the New York Supreme Court, Appellate Division.

Biography
He was born on October 26, 1924, in New York City. He graduated from Brooklyn College, and in 1954 from Brooklyn Law School. Thompson served in the United States Army during World War II.

He was a member of the New York State Senate from 1965 to 1968, sitting in the 175th, 176th and 177th New York State Legislatures. He was a Democrat. He was Brooklyn's first African-American State Senator.

He was a member of the New York City Council from 1969 to 1973. In November 1973, he was elected to the New York Supreme Court.

In November 1974 he was designated as an associate justice of the Appellate Term, 2nd and 11th Districts. In December 1980, he was designated an associate justice of the Appellate Division, Second Department. He retired from the bench at the end of 2000 when he reached the constitutional age limit, and then became of counsel to the law firm of Roger Victor Archibald, PLLC.

Thompson died on December 24, 2018, at the age of 94. New York City Comptroller Bill Thompson (born 1953) was his son.

References

1924 births
2018 deaths
African-American state legislators in New York (state)
Brooklyn College alumni
Brooklyn Law School alumni
Lawyers from New York City
Politicians from Brooklyn
Military personnel from New York City
Democratic Party New York (state) state senators
New York Supreme Court Justices
New York City Council members
20th-century American judges
20th-century American lawyers
20th-century African-American people
21st-century African-American people
African-American New York City Council members